Forces and Feelings is an album by the American jazz saxophonist Maurice McIntyre recorded in 1970 and released by the Delmark label.

Reception

Allmusic reviewer Al Campbell stated "Much like his first effort, Humility in Light of the Creator, Forces and Feelings projects a spiritual tone. While it is occasionally more relaxed than his debut, that's not to say this is McIntyre's mellow disc -- far from it. ... Considering the lack of recordings made by this underrated tenor saxophonist, any of his discs are recommended.".

Track listing
All compositions by Kalaparusha Maurice McIntyre
 "Behold! God's Sunshine!" – 4:24 Additional track on CD reissue	
 "Fifteen or Sixteen" – 10:06
 "Sun Spots" – 7:48
 "Ananda" – 3:50
 "Twenty-One Lines" – 11:48
 "Behold! God's Sunshine!" – 8:19	
 "Ananda" – 9:26 Additional track on CD reissue

Personnel
Kalaparusha Maurice McIntyre - tenor saxophone, clarinet, flute, bells
Sarnie Garrett – guitar
Fred Hopkins – bass
Wesley Tyus – drums 
Rita Omolokun – vocals

References

Delmark Records albums
1970 albums
Kalaparusha Maurice McIntyre albums
Albums produced by Bob Koester